Hlučín is a town in Opava District the Moravian-Silesian Region of the Czech Republic. It has about 14,000 inhabitants. It was the centre of the historic Hlučín Region. The historic town centre is well preserved and is protected by law as an urban monument zone.

Administrative parts
The villages of Bobrovníky and Darkovičky are administrative parts of Hlučín.

Geography

The northern part of the municipal territory lies in the Opava Hilly Land within the Silesian Lowlands. The southern part extends into the eastern tip of the Nízký Jeseník mountain range.

Hlučínské Lake is an artificial lake on the outskirts of the town. The Opava River forms the southeastern municipal border.

History

The first written mention of Hlučín is from 1303. The town was probably founded by King Ottokar II of Bohemia in 1256, to ensure peace on the border between Margraviate of Moravia and Duchy of Opole.

Until 1521, Hlučín belonged to the Landek estate within the Duchy of Troppau. In 1521, it was acquired by the Dukes of Opole. In the 17th and 18th centuries, the town burned down several times. In 1694 it was liberated of its serfdom. In 1742 after the First Silesian War, the town was given to the Kingdom of Prussia by the Treaty of Berlin. In 1845, the Hlučín estate was bought by the Rothschild family.

The town was administered by the Prussian Province of Silesia until 1920, when it became part of Czechoslovakia after World War I. The transferral of the Hlučín Region sparked controversy between Germans, Czechs and Poles. By a biased interpretation of the law, the new Czechoslovak authorities banned schooling in German even though that was the language spoken by the majority in the town.

After the Munich Agreement in 1938, Hlučín was annexed by Nazi Germany and was again made part of the Province of Silesia, and its German name Hultschin was restored. Hlučín was restored to Czechoslovakia in 1945. People identified as German-speaking at the census in 1930 were expelled, some Germans left voluntarily. People who were labeled Czechs, even though they were actually Czech-speaking Germans, were spared expulsion.

Demographics

Sights

The historic town centre is formed by the Mírové Square and its surroundings. The centre was delimited by town fortifications, built in 1534–1535. Most of the town walls were demolished by 1829. Several fragments and seven bastions have been preserved to this day.

Hlučín Castle was built in the late Gothic style in 1526. It is a two-storey building with an irregular floor plan, and includes a small castle park. Today it houses the Hlučín Region Museum.

The second landmark is the parish Church of Saint John the Baptist. It was first mentioned in 1378 and was rebuilt several times in Renaissance, Baroque and pseudo-Gothic styles.

There is the Hlučín-Darkovičky Czechoslovak Fortification Complex in Darkovičky. It is an exhibition of a unique military technology from the 1930s.

Notable people
Pavel Josef Vejvanovský (c. 1639–1693), composer
Emanuel Schäfer (1900–1974), German SS functionary and war criminal
Verner Lička (born 1954), football player and manager
Jiří Pavlenka (born 1992), footballer
Michaela Konečná (born 1998), handball player

Twin towns – sister cities

Hlučín is twinned with:
 Namysłów, Poland
 Nebelschütz, Germany
 Ružomberok, Slovakia

References

External links

Official website 
Tourist information centre of Hlučín

Cities and towns in the Czech Republic
Populated places in Opava District
Hlučín Region